Mario Sabino Júnior (September 23, 1972 – October 25, 2019) was a Brazilian judoka, who won the gold medal in the half heavyweight division (– 100 kg) at the 2003 Pan American Games. In the final he defeated Canada's Nicolas Gill. He represented his native country a year later at the 2004 Summer Olympics in Athens, Greece.

Sabino died at age 47 on October 25, 2019, after being shot in Bauru.

References

External links
 
 
 Profile 

1972 births
2019 deaths
Judoka at the 2000 Summer Olympics
Judoka at the 2004 Summer Olympics
Judoka at the 2003 Pan American Games
Olympic judoka of Brazil
Brazilian male judoka
Pan American Games gold medalists for Brazil
Pan American Games medalists in judo
Universiade medalists in judo
South American Games gold medalists for Brazil
South American Games medalists in judo
Competitors at the 2002 South American Games
Universiade silver medalists for Brazil
Deaths by firearm in Brazil
Afro-Brazilian sportspeople
Medalists at the 1985 Summer Universiade
Medalists at the 2003 Pan American Games
Brazilian murder victims
Male murder victims
Sportspeople from São Paulo (state)
21st-century Brazilian people
20th-century Brazilian people